Jay Whitehead (born April 8, 1959) is an American author and publisher most notable for publishing Corporate Responsibility Officer (CRO) magazine.

Writing and publishing career
Whitehead graduated from UCLA. 
He co-founded The CRO Association. He published Human Resources Outsourcing Today and HRO Europe Magazines. He co-founded The HRO Association.

His magazine Corporate Responsibility Officer issues an annual list, The 100 Best Corporate Citizens,. This effort was ranked by PR Week/Burson-Marsteller as the 3rd most influential corporate ranking in the nation. In 2009 Whitehead was named #73 on Ethisphere Magazine's 100 Most Influential People in Business Ethics list.

Whitehead is co-author (with Amit Chatterjee) of the 2009 book The Post-Carbon Economy.

On May 4, 2012, Whitehead started serving as CEO of Charity Partners, Inc. and Tickets-for-Charity.com.

Personal
Whitehead is an avid marathon runner.

References

External links
 — Ethisphere Magazine's 100 Most Influential People in Business Ethics List for 2009
 EcoInnovator's review of The Post-Carbon Economy book
 Corporate Responsibility Officer magazine's website
 Managing Automation magazine's interview with co-author of The Post-Carbon Economy
 Boston Herald features Jay Whitehead as CEO of Tickets-for-Charity.

Corporate governance in the United States
1959 births
Living people
American publishers (people)
American male writers